Thomas J. McLaughlin is a retired American soccer forward who played professionally in the USISL and Major League Soccer.

Youth
McLaughlin graduated from La Salle College High School in 1993.  He played soccer for FC Delco from 1991 to 1996.  He attended the Harvard University, playing on the men's soccer team from 1993 to 1997.  McLaughlin was the 1997 Ivy League Player of the Year.

Professional
On February 1, 1998, the New England Revolution selected McLaughlin in the third round (thirty-sixth overall) of the 1998 MLS College Draft.  He played one game for the Revolution before being released on June 30, 1998.  He then signed with the Worcester Wildfire for the remainder of the 1998 USISL A-League season.

References

External links
 Tommy Mac Set for the Revolution
 

1976 births
Living people
American soccer players
Harvard Crimson men's soccer players
Major League Soccer players
New England Revolution players
Worcester Wildfire players
A-League (1995–2004) players
New England Revolution draft picks
Soccer players from Pennsylvania
Association football forwards